Cheddar Association Football Club is a football club based in Cheddar, near Wells in Somerset, England.

History
The club was established in 1892. They later joined the Cheddar Valley League, and were champions in 1910–11. The club later transferred to the Weston-super-Mare and District Football League, and won the Somerset Junior Cup in 1931–32. After World War II they rejoined the Cheddar Valley League. The club later moved up to the Somerset County League in 1961, finishing bottom of Division One in 1961–62 and 1962–63.

In 1988–89 Cheddar won the Somerset County League's Division Two and Three Cup. In 1989–90 they finished third in Division Two, earning promotion to Division One. However, they were relegated back to Division Two after three seasons. Another third-place finish in 1997–98 saw the club promoted to Division One again, and in 1999–2000 they won the Premier Division/Division One Cup. In 2003–04 the club were Division One champions, earning promotion to the Premier Division.

Cheddar were Somerset County League Premier Division runners-up in 2011–12 and were promoted to Division One of the Western League.

Honours
Somerset County League
Division One champions 2003–04
Premier/Division One Cup winners 1999–2000
Division Two/Three Cup winners 1988–89
Cheddar Valley League
Champions 1910–11
Cheddar Valley Knockout Cup 
Winners 1911–12
Cheddar Valley Charity Cup
Winners 1947–48, 1949–50
Somerset Junior Cup
Winners 1931–32

Records
Best FA Cup performance: preliminary round, 2018-19
Best FA Vase performance: Second qualifying round, 2016–17

References

External links
Official website

Football clubs in England
Football clubs in Somerset
Association football clubs established in 1892
1892 establishments in England
Weston-super-Mare and District Football League
Somerset County League
Western Football League
Cheddar, Somerset